Savedi is a suburb in the northern part of Ahmednagar in the Indian state of Maharashtra. The All India Radio centre and the TV Centre of Prasar Bharati are located in this area.It is Biggest Suburban city of Ahmednagar.Savedi is Enriched With great Facilities With Shops and Mall
It also has Very Good Health facilities and Food Courts like Cafe and Hotels,It has Upcoming Kohinoor Mall and D Mart Mall,It is Mainly Connected By Roads Like Pipeline Road,Gulmohar Road,Kushtadham Road,Lekhanagar Road

Geography 
Savedi is located in Nagar-Manmad Road (State Highway 10) and Nagar-Aurangabad Road. The Aurangabad Road and Manmad Road pass through this area of the city.It is Sub-Urban City Present in North Side Of Ahmednagar City,it has Lot amount of Greenery and Parks

Population
The population numbers some 100,000. 

The inhabitants consist of natives as well as students and other migrants. Many people moved to Savedi from Ahmednagar city as the city expanded. This suburb hosts industrialists, professors, workers, and celebrities.

Culture

Temples
 Ayyappa Temple, Vaidu Wadi
 Dattatreya Temple, Premdan Chowk
 Shiv Mandir,Lekhanagar Road
 Datt Mandir,Lekhnagar

Cultural halls 
 Raosaheb Patwardhan Smarak
 Shri. Swami samarth temple, Vrundawan colony, Rasane nagar.
 Durga Mata temple, Onkar colony, Rasane Nagar.

NGOs
 Apang sanjeevni societie's mukbadhir vidalaya

Marathi medium schools 
 M.E.S. Renavikar Vidya Mandir
 Shri Samarth Vidya Mandir, Bhistbaug Road.
 Jai Bajrang Vidyalaya, Gulmohur Road.
 Anand Vidyalaya, Gulmohur Road.

English medium schools 
 Auxilium Convent School, Manmad Road
 Swami Vivekanand School, Tarakpur
 St. Xavier's, Tarakpur
 Athare Patil Public Hospital
 Sree Sai English School
 Swami Vivekanand High School
 Indus World School
 Kidzee Preschool

Colleges 
 Pemraj Sarda College
 Ahmednagar Homoeopathic Medical College, Manmad Road
 Shri Samarth Vidya Mandir (Junior College)
 Jai Bajrang Vidyalaya
 New Art & Science Collage

Health
Hospitals include:
 Noble Hospital, Premdan Chowk
 Oberoi Hospital, Zopadi Canteen
 Surabhi Hospital,Gulmohar Road
 Mac Care Hospital,Ekveera Chwak
 Neoron Plus Hospital
 Medplus Hospital
 Athare Patil Hospital
 Daule Hospital
 Ruby Hall Hospital

Economy
Ahmednagar's  hyper-market Big Bazaar is situated at Premdan Chowk in this suburb.
 Reliance Smart Store at Savedi

Mall and Shops
 Smart Bazzar
 Reliance Smart Store
 Reliance Trends
 Guru Supermarket
 Kohinoor Mall
 Auram Mall
 Titan World
 Fox Clothing
 Croma Electronic Store
 Kalyan Jewels
 Chandukaka Jewels
 Van Heusen
 Tanishq Jeweler
 Malabar Gold and Jewelers

Entertainment
Ahmednagar's culture is abetted by every type of entertainment. Every Gudhipadwa attracts the city's leading cultural society Rasik Group organizes this musical event. This event is free, attracting a huge audience. Savedi hosts cultural festivals including Ganapati Festival, Navaratri, Lord Balaji Festival, lighting festivals at Datta Temple and Ayyappa Temple. The suburb also hosts theaters, dedicated grounds for activities, multipurpose halls and a cinema multiplex. Savedi attracts exhibitions, fairs, and circuses.

Ahmednagar Karandak is an annual stage competition.

Ahmednagar Film Festival is a newes film festival.

Notables 

 Sadashiv Amrapurkar
 Milind Shinde
 Madhukar Toradmal

Transport 
It can be reached by bus.
Ahmednagar Mahanagarpalika Transport (AMT) Bus Are Available.
Rikshaws,Vans are Available

External links
 Pinsearch
 AMC
 Blue Sky Big Bazaar All Stores In India

Ahmednagar district